Azharul Haque (1940-1971) was a Bangladeshi physician-surgeon, who was killed in the Bangladesh Liberation War and is considered to be a martyr intellectual in Bangladesh.

Early life
Haque was born on 2 March 1940 in Dhaka, East Bengal, British Raj. His father Md. Zahurul Haque, was from West Bengal and was the jailer of Dhaka Central Jail. After his father died he lived under the care of his older brother, Anwarul Haque who was also a jail official. He moved around in East Bengal following the different places his brother was posted. He completed his Licentiate in Medicine and Surgery degree from Sylhet Medical College in 1963 and then completed his MBBS from Sir Salimullah Medical College in 1968.

Career
In 1969 he joined Dhaka Medical College as an Assistant Surgeon. After the outbreak of Bangladesh Liberation war he provided treatment to members of Mukti Bahini in his private chambers in Hatirpool, Dhaka. He was warned by the paramilitary Al-Badr over his activities in a letter addressed to his practice. In July 1971 he was summoned to the Police headquarters and warned. He started treating members of Mukti Bahini in slums near his practice.

Death and legacy
On 15 November 1971, a curfew was imposed on Dhaka. The area around his practice was surrounded by members of Al-Badr. He and another doctor, A B M Hamayun Kabir were waiting for an ambulance when they were spotted by the Al-Badr members. Who interrogated them, the Al-Badr were looking for Dr. Azharul Haque and arrested the two doctors. On 16 November 1971 the bodies of Dr Azharul Haque and A B M Hamayun Kabir were found in a culvert near Notre Dame College in Motijheel, Dhaka with their hands tied and blindfolded. He was buried in Azimpur graveyard. On 14 December 1995, Bangladesh Post Office released commemorative stamps in his name.

References

1940 births
1971 deaths
People killed in the Bangladesh Liberation War
People from Dhaka
Bangladeshi surgeons
Mukti Bahini personnel
Academic staff of Dhaka Medical College and Hospital
20th-century surgeons
Sylhet MAG Osmani Medical College alumni